The Aviary is a historic aviary building located in Miller Park at Lynchburg, Virginia.  It is a Queen Anne-style structure erected in 1902.  The multi-sided exhibition house was designed by the local architectural firm of Frye & Chesterman.  The building was a gift to the city of Lynchburg from Randolph Guggenheimer of New York City. When completed, the Aviary housed, "Seven cages containing monkeys, one with at least a half dozen healthy alligators, one with cockatoos, one with Australian doves, one with parrots and one with canaries."  It later became a branch library and an office structure for the city Department of Parks and Recreation.

It was listed on the National Register of Historic Places in 1980.

References

Agricultural buildings and structures on the National Register of Historic Places in Virginia
Queen Anne architecture in Virginia
Buildings and structures completed in 1902
Buildings and structures in Lynchburg, Virginia
National Register of Historic Places in Lynchburg, Virginia